Tigerella is a bi-colored tomato cultivar, relatively small, 2 to 4 ounces (60-120 g), and early (59 days). Upon maturity the fruit is red with yellow stripes, essentially the same as Green Zebra, except that the fruit is red instead of green, and has a sweeter flavor. The colour occasionally varies, in New Zealand for instance, commercially produced Tigerella is dark crimson red with very dark green stripes.

Seeds are available in the UK for the heirloom Tigerella (which has small plum/cherry-type tomatoes). In the USA there is also a hybrid (non-heirloom) beefsteak tomato that is also called Tigerella, for which culinary results seem to range widely according to a number of bloggers, from large firm and good-tasting fruit to inedible soft fruit which on cutting appears to be all gel and seeds.

See also
 List of tomato cultivars

References

External links
 Instructions for growing and description of Tigerella tomatoes

Tomato cultivars